Cirilo Antonio Rivarola Acosta (1836 – 31 December 1878) was the 4th President of Paraguay and served from 1870 to 1871.

Biography
The Rivarola family was important in Paraguayan politics throughout the 19th century, and often found itself at odds with the Francia and López governments. During most of the War of the Triple Alliance, Rivarola served in the Paraguayan Army, reaching the rank of Sergeant.  In 1869, however, amidst a wave of repression led by then president Francisco Solano López, he was arrested due to reasons unknown. He then escaped captivity and in some of the war's remaining months served as a spy for the allies.  Afterwards, he went to Asunción, where, thanks in part to his good relations with the Brazilian authorities, he was made one of the triumvirs who headed the provisional government that was created (mostly by Silva Paranhos, the chief Brazilian diplomat in Paraguay then).

As both other triumvirs eventually resigned, Rivarola wound up being president of Paraguay until August 31, 1870, when the Paraguayan Congress elected Facundo Machaín president along with the new constitution's proclamation. On the very next day, however, his presidency was renewed, as the Brazilian occupiers disagreed with Machaín's nomination. Rivarola then presided over Paraguay's settlement with the alliance and return to peace, though Paraguay's recovery would be very slow.

He resigned in December 1871 due to a constitutional crisis. This was part of a ploy he had orchestrated with Juan Bautista Gill, president of the senate, where Gill would refuse his resignation and give him more power, but when the motion came to the Senate floor, Gill accepted it unreservedly.

During the next few years, Rivarola, owner of an important estate in the south of the country, several times rebelled against the government in Asunción, most of them with Argentinian support, for during the 1870s Brazilian influence was preponderant in most Paraguayan governments. In 1878, while on his way to a meeting with President Cándido Bareiro, after he had been given a pardon, Rivarola was assassinated, stabbed to death by masked individuals in broad daylight. No one was ever arrested for this crime, despite it having happened less than 100 meters from the presidential palace.

References

1836 births
1878 deaths
People from Asunción
Paraguayan people of Italian descent
Presidents of Paraguay
Assassinated Paraguayan politicians
Deaths by stabbing in Paraguay
Paraguayan murder victims